

Texas Pete is a brand of hot sauce in the United States developed and manufactured by the TW Garner Food Company in Winston-Salem, North Carolina. TW Garner was founded by Thad W. Garner in 1929. Texas Pete is the third best selling hot sauce in the United States as of 2004.

History 
Texas Pete hot sauce was introduced in 1929 by Sam Garner, operator of the Dixie Pig barbecue stand in Winston-Salem, North Carolina. Customers asked for a spicier sauce, and the Garners concocted one with cayenne peppers. Developing a product name, a marketing adviser suggested "Mexican Joe" to connote the spicy cuisine of Mexico. However, Thad's father Sam Garner opposed this, saying that the name should be American. Texas is known for its spicy food; this was combined with Pete, the nickname of Thad's brother Harold Garner.

Lawsuit
Phillip White of California filed a lawsuit against T.W. Garner on September 12, 2022 for a "false marketing and labeling scheme". White said he was deceived into thinking the sauce was made in Texas. The 49-page complaint says, "There is nothing 'Texas' about Texas Pete."

Carcinogen
The ingredient Sodium Benzoate ("Benzoate of Soda" under "...Nutrition Info") is a common preservative. Scientists have shown that when mixed with ascorbic acid (vitamin C), it turns into benzene, a known carcinogen. Sodium benzoate in beverages that also contain vitamin C may, therefore, be problematic. Hot peppers naturally contain vitamin C ("nearly as much as in one orange") so the observation about beverages applies to pepper sauces containing sodium benzoate, like Texas Pete. Hot pepper sauces typically contain some vitamin C, as does Texas Pete.

Products 
The brand has 6, 12, and 24 ounce bottles with bright red sauce, flip top, and white and yellow label featuring the name in red and "Texas Pete," a red silhouette cowboy. Texas Pete is fairly mild, registering 747 on the Scoville heat scale. Its auxiliary branded Hotter Hot Sauce is claimed to be three times hotter than original Texas Pete. Texas Pete also makes a sautéed garlic hot sauce. In 2013, Texas Pete introduced the "Cha!" Sriracha sauce. Sabor! by Texas Pete was released in 2016 as their Mexican style hot sauce. In 2015, the TW Garner Food Company discontinued production of its Texas Pete Chili Sauce for hot dogs and hamburgers.

See also

List of hot sauces
Hot sauce
Scoville heat scale

References

External links

Hot sauces
Brand name condiments
Companies based in Winston-Salem, North Carolina
Products introduced in 1929